Nathaniel Bouton (June 20, 1799 – June 6, 1878) was an American minister and historian.

Biography
Bouton, the youngest of fourteen children of William and Sarah (Benedict) Bouton, was born in Norwalk, Connecticut, June 20, 1799. At the age of 14 he was bound out as an apprentice in a printing office in Bridgeport, Connecticut, and three years later purchased the balance of his time in order to obtain an education for the ministry.

He graduated from Yale College in 1821. He then attended the Andover Theological Seminary, from which he graduated in 1824. On March 23, 1825, he was named pastor of the First Congregational Church in Concord, New Hampshire, where he remained until his resignation on March 23, 1867.

He was interested in historical studies, and authored History of Concord (1 vol., octavo, 1856, 786 pages). He also served as president of the New Hampshire Historical Society, and edited two volumes of its Collections.

In August 1866, he was appointed Editor and Compiler of the Provincial Records of New Hampshire, and in that capacity issued ten volumes of Provincial Papers, from 1867 to 1877. He also published over 30 sermons and addresses, and a few other volumes. Dartmouth College (of which he was a trustee from 1840 to 1877) conferred on him the honorary degree of Doctor of Divinity in 1851.

He died in Concord on June 6, 1878, aged 79 years.  he was buried at Pine Island Cemetery in Norwalk

He was married, September 11, 1825, to Harriet, daughter of Rev. John Sherman (Y. C. 1792) and the great-granddaughter of founding father Roger Sherman, who died in Concord, May 21, 1828, aged 21. His second wife, Mary Ann, daughter of John Bell, of Chester, New Hampshire, died in Concord, February 15, 1839, aged 34. His third wife was Elizabeth Ann, daughter of Horatio G. Cilley, of Deerfield, New Hampshire. He had two children by the first marriage, five by the second, and six by the third.

Further reading
Bouton, Nathaniel; ed. Bouton, John Bell (1879) Autobiography of Nathaniel Bouton, D.D. : former pastor of the First Congregational Church of Concord, and late state historian of New Hampshire : also, tributes to his memory by Prof. Henry D. Parker, D.D., E.E. Cummings, D.D., and Rev. F.D. Ayer New York: Anson D.F. Randolph & Company

External links
 Books by Bouton
 

1799 births
1878 deaths
Writers from Norwalk, Connecticut
Yale College alumni
Andover Newton Theological School alumni
American Congregationalist ministers
American male non-fiction writers
19th-century American clergy
Historians from Connecticut